SC-19 may refer to: 

USS SC-19, an SC-1-class submarine chaser built for the United States Navy during World War I
SC-19, a derivative of the HQ-9 missile